The electoral district of Bellarine is one of the electoral districts of Victoria, Australia, for the Victorian Legislative Assembly. It covers an area of  stretching from the Bellarine Peninsula to the outer eastern suburbs of Geelong. It includes the towns of Barwon Heads, Clifton Springs, Drysdale, Indented Head, Ocean Grove, Point Lonsdale, Portarlington and Queenscliff and the Geelong suburbs of Leopold and Moolap. It lies within the Western Victoria Region of the upper house, the Legislative Council.

The seat was first created in a redistribution prior to the 1967 election but was abolished and replaced by Geelong East and South Barwon in 1976. It was revived prior to the 1985 election after Geelong East was itself abolished and population increases in South Barwon moved that electorate westwards.

It has traditionally been a marginal seat. Graham Ernst of the Labor Party won the seat in the 1985 and 1988 elections but was defeated at the 1992 election by the Liberal Party's Garry Spry who held the seat until his retirement in 2002. At the election in November of that year it was one of many seats to fall to the Labor Party, with Lisa Neville winning the seat on a swing of over nine percent.

Members for Bellarine

Election results

References

External links
 Electorate profile: Bellarine District, Victorian Electoral Commission

Bellarine
Geelong
Bellarine Peninsula
Bellarine
Bellarine
Bellarine
Barwon South West (region)